Vyacheslav Ivanovich Lemeshev (April 3, 1952 in Moscow — January 27, 1996) was an Olympic boxer from the USSR. Soviet physiologists, while examining Lemeshev abilities with  electronic measuring devices, discovered his extremely fast, split-second reaction, uncommon not only for boxers, but for the other athletes as well, and decisive when it comes to the counterpunches and cross-counters, in which he was one of the best in the entire middleweight, though severe trauma of the left hand (Lemeshev was a southpaw) ended his olympic career, and boxing career as well, when resulted in several knockout losses in a row.

Career
Lemeshev trained at the Armed Forces sports society in Moscow. During his career Lemeshev won 103 fights out of 111. He won the gold medal in the middleweight division (–75 kg) at the 1972 Summer Olympics in Munich. Lemeshev knocked out four of his five opponents to win the gold medal. He knocked out future World Light Heavyweight champion, American Marvin Johnson in two rounds in a semifinal, avenging an earlier loss to Johnson in the Soviet Union. He then scored a 1st round knockout (Time 2:17) over Reima Virtanen of Finland to win the gold medal. He also won European Championships in 1973 and 1975 and 1974 USSR Championship. He became the Honoured Master of Sports of the USSR in 1972 and was awarded the Order of the Badge of Honor in the same year.

1972 Olympic results
 Round of 32: Defeated Wiem Gommies (Indonesia) KO 1
 Round of 16: Defeated Hans-Joachim Brauske (East Germany) by decision, 5-0
 Quarterfinal: Defeated Nazif Kuran (Turkey) TKO 2
 Semifinal: Defeated Marvin Johnson (United States) TKO 2
 Final: Defeated Reima Virtanen (Finland) KO 1 (won gold medal)

References
sports-reference

External links

1952 births
1996 deaths
Martial artists from Moscow
Honoured Masters of Sport of the USSR
Soviet male boxers
Middleweight boxers
Boxers at the 1972 Summer Olympics
Olympic boxers of the Soviet Union
Olympic gold medalists for the Soviet Union
Armed Forces sports society athletes
Olympic medalists in boxing
Russian male boxers
Medalists at the 1972 Summer Olympics
Southpaw boxers